Witherspoon Building is a historic office building located in the Market East neighborhood of Philadelphia, Pennsylvania. It was designed by architect Joseph M. Huston (1866–1940) and built between 1895 and 1897. It was built for the Presbyterian Board of Publications and Sabbath School Work. It is an 11-story, steel frame "E"-shaped building, faced with brick and granite.  It has terra cotta decorative elements. Its exterior features Corinthian order and Ionic order columns, statues, medallions, seals of various boards and agencies of the Presbyterian Church and of related Reformed churches. It is named for John Witherspoon (1723–1794), a president of Princeton University.

It was added to the National Register of Historic Places in 1978.

Sculpture
Several statues and some of the medallions were designed by sculptor Alexander Stirling Calder (1870–1945), including statues of six historically prominent Presbyterians, Francis Makemie, John Witherspoon, John McMillan, Samuel Davies, James Caldwell and Marcus Whitman. These sculptures were removed in 1961 and later moved to the courtyard of the Presbyterian Historical Society in Philadelphia.

References

Properties of religious function on the National Register of Historic Places in Philadelphia
Commercial buildings on the National Register of Historic Places in Philadelphia
Office buildings completed in 1897
Market East, Philadelphia
Skyscraper office buildings in Philadelphia